The WorldRiskReport is an annual technical report on global disaster risks. The yearly issues of the WorldRiskReport focus on varying critical topics related to disaster risk management and are published in German and English. The report includes the WorldRiskIndex, which identifies the risk of an extreme natural event becoming a disaster for 181 countries worldwide.

The report has been published annually by Bündnis Entwicklung Hilft since 2011 – until 2016 in cooperation with the Institute for Environment and Human Security (UNU-EHS) at the United Nations University in Bonn. Since 2018, the WorldRiskReport has been published jointly with the Institute for International Law of Peace and Armed Conflict (IFHV) at the Ruhr University Bochum.

The report aims to highlight linkages between extreme natural events, climate change, disaster risk reduction, and social inequality at the global level to provide a realistic picture of disasters and risk. Through the close exchange between science and development policy practice, approaches to solutions and recommendations for action for current challenges in disaster risk reduction, climate change adaptation, and development policy are identified.

Focal topics 

With the focus topics in the WorldRiskReport, the quantitative disaster risk analysis in the form of the WorldRiskIndex is supplemented by several focus articles on central aspects of disaster risk and its management. In addition to the focus articles, the reports usually contain several case studies intended to provide insights into the project work of the member organizations of Bündnis Entwicklung Hilft on the respective focus topics. For the focus articles and case studies, Bündnis Entwicklung Hilft and IFHV cooperate with external experts from science and practice, thus aiming to provide a comprehensive and multi-layered perspective on disaster risk as a complex phenomenon. So far, the following focal topics have been addressed in the context of the WorldRiskReports:

 2021: Social Protection
 2020: Forced Displacement and Migration
 2019: Water Supply
 2018: Child Protection and Children's Rights
 2017: Analysis and Prospects
 2016: Logistics and Infrastructure
 2015: Food Security
 2014: The  as a Risk Area
 2013: Health and Healthcare
 2012: Environmental Degradation and Disasters
 2011: Governance and Civil Society

WorldRiskIndex 

The WorldRiskIndex uses 27 aggregated, publicly available indicators to determine disaster risk for 181 countries worldwide. Conceptually, the index is composed of exposure to extreme natural hazards and the societal vulnerability of individual countries. Earthquakes, cyclones, floods, droughts, and climate-induced sea-level rise are considered in the exposure analysis. Societal vulnerability is divided into susceptibility to extreme natural events, lack of coping capacities, and lack of adaptive capacities. All index components are scaled to the value range from 0 to 100. The higher a country's index score on the WorldRiskIndex, the higher its national disaster risk. For illustration and better comparability of the results, all countries are divided into five nearly equal classes using the quintile method.

The primary methodological concept of the index was developed jointly by the United Nations University Institute for Environment and Human Security (UNU-EHS) and Bündnis Entwicklung Hilft and first published in 2011.

Since 2017, the index has been calculated and methodologically advanced by IFHV. As part of the index's evolution to date, new datasets on exposure and societal vulnerability have been included, and the number of countries analyzed has been expanded.

Media resonance 

The publication of the WorldRiskReports has regularly reached widespread media resonance in Germany in recent years. The WorldRiskReport also attracts attention in the international press.

The 2019 and 2020 WorldRiskReports on the focal topics of water supply and forced displacement and migration were presented at two conferences organized by the European Commission's Directorate-General for European Civil Protection and Humanitarian Aid Operations (ECHO) and discussed by experts from academia, politics, and development policy practice.

Related publications 

Based on the concept of the WorldRiskIndex, index-based risk analyses for freshwater regions, the global fisheries sector, and mangrove areas were conducted in cooperation between Bündnis Entwicklung Hilft and the global environmental organization The Nature Conservancy, as well as in collaboration with several universities such as the University of California Santa Cruz and McGill University. The cooperation project between Bündnis Entwicklung Hilft and The Nature Conservancy is part of the International Climate Initiative (IKI) and was funded by the German Federal Ministry for the Environment, Nature Conservation, and Nuclear Safety.

References

External links 

 Project page WorldRiskReport
 WorldRiskReport project description IFHV
 WorldRiskReport project description United Nations University

International rankings

Hazard analysis
Disaster preparedness